Teretoctopus is a genus of octopuses in the family Octopodidae.

Species
 Teretoctopus alcocki Robson, 1932
 Teretoctopus indicus Robson, 1929

References

External links

 

Octopodidae
Cephalopod genera